The 2013 Regional Women's Championship was a 50-over women's cricket competition that took place in the West Indies. It took place in August 2013, with 8 teams taking part and all matches taking place in Grenada and Saint Lucia. Jamaica won the tournament, beating Trinidad and Tobago in the final to win their second 50-over title in two years.

The tournament was followed by the 2013 Regional Women's Twenty20 Championship.

Competition format 
The eight teams were divided into two groups of four, playing every team in their group once. Matches were played using a one day format with 50 overs per side. The top two teams in each group advanced to the semi-finals, whilst the bottom two teams in each group went into a play-off round.

The group worked on a points system with positions being based on the total points. Points were awarded as follows:

Win: 4 points 
Tie: 2 points 
Loss: 0 points.
Abandoned/No Result: 2 points.
Bonus Points: 1 bonus point available per match.

Points tables

Group A

Group B

Source: CricketArchive

Knockout stage

Play-Offs

Semi-finals

Final

Statistics

Most runs

Source: CricketArchive

Most wickets

Source: CricketArchive

References

Women's Super50 Cup
2013 in West Indian cricket